Andrew Buchanan of Drumpellier (1690–1759) was a Scottish tobacco merchant who was one of Glasgow's "Tobacco Lords".  He served as Lord Provost of Glasgow from 1740 to 1742. Buchanan Street in Glasgow is named after him.

Life

Andrew Buchanan was born in 1690. He was the second of four sons to George Buchanan, a maltster in Glasgow, and his wife, Mary Maxwell, daughter of Gabriel Maxwell a Glasgow merchant. His father had been a Covenanter who had fought at the Battle of Bothwell Bridge and was descended from the Buchanans of Buchanan and Leny.

In his youth, he shared lodgings with Robert Carrick, then a Divinity student, and later Rev Robert Carrick. The Reverend's son, also Robert Carrick became a rich banker, and clearly an admirer of the Buchanans later left his entire fortune to them.

He was one of the first Scots to have tobacco plantations in "the New World", with major holdings in Virginia. He is believed to have owned up to 300 slaves.

In 1719, he purchased a property at the Long Croft in Glasgow. He purchased two further properties nearby in 1732 and 1740. Having assembled sufficient adjoining properties he then created a new street: Virginia Street, lined with new villas. His own house on the street, Virginia Mansion, was not completed in his lifetime. Virginia Street still exists in the Merchant City but none of the original houses survive.

In 1725, with his brothers Neil and Archibald Buchanan, he founded the Buchanan Society a charity which gave financial help to apprentices and widows of the Buchanan clan. The Society still exists and provides hardship and educational grants to those of the clan and its septs.

In 1735, with his new-found wealth, he purchased the estate of Drumpellier building Drumpellier House there from 1736 to 1739 and extending it twice thereafter. In 1737 he bought an additional estate at Auchentorlie.

He had served in Glasgow Town Council since 1728 as Dean of Guild and, in 1740, he was elected Lord Provost of Glasgow. In 1745, after the Battle of Prestonpans, Buchanan was one of the commissioners who met John Hay, quarter-master to Bonnie Prince Charlie's army. However, he became deeply unpopular with the prince in reducing the required levy from 15,000 shillings to 5,500 shillings. This resulted in a personal levy of 500 shilling bounty being levied by the Prince against Buchanan.

In 1750, he was one of the joint founders of the Old Ship Bank on the corner of Saltmarket and Bridgegate, Glasgow's first local bank.

He died in Glasgow on 20 December 1759 and is buried in the Ramshorn Cemetery in the centre of the city.

Andrew's descendant, Lt Col Carrick Buchanan, gifted Drumpellier House and its grounds to the town of Coatbridge in 1919 and it is now Drumpellier Country Park.

Legacy

Although built after his death (1777) Buchanan Street in Glasgow was built on lands owned by his son James, and therefore links also to Andrew.

Family

He was married to Marion Montgomery and had two sons and four daughters.

His eldest son James Buchanan of Drumpellier (1726–1786) was twice Lord Provost of Glasgow.

His second son was George Buchanan of Mount Vernon (1728–1762).

His daughter Mary Buchanan married Alexander Speirs of Elderslie in 1755 and he too then became a tobacco lord.

References

1690 births
1759 deaths
Businesspeople from Glasgow
Lord Provosts of Glasgow
Scottish slave owners